The 1947–48 English National League season was the seventh season of the English National League, the top level ice hockey league in England. Seven teams participated in the league, and the Brighton Tigers won the championship.

Regular season

External links
 Nottingham Panthers history site

Eng
Engl
Engl
English National League seasons
1947–48 in British ice hockey